The Muslim Free Hospital was established as a small dispensary in 1937 in Yangon, Myanmar (formerly Burma) and gradually it has come up to the present status of a 160 bedded hospital.

The chief aims and objectives of the hospital are to help the poor, the needy and the sick without discrimination of caste, creed or colour. The hospital is one of many in Myanmar run purely on a voluntary means and raises funds to treat people.

The hospital comprises three buildings; main on the Maha Bandula Garden Street and two buildings on the 35th Street and are connected by over head bridges.

The author and human rights activist Ma Thida has worked as a surgeon at the hospital.

References

Hospitals in Myanmar
Hospitals in Yangon
Hospitals established in 1937
1937 establishments in Burma
Voluntary hospitals